Tiago Alves may refer to:
Tiago Alves (footballer, born 1984), Brazilian footballer who plays as a defender
Tiago Alves (footballer, born 1993), Brazilian footballer who plays as a winger
Tiago Alves (footballer, born 1996), Portuguese footballer who plays as a winger

See also
Thiago Alves (disambiguation)